Rabīʿa ibn Nizar is the patriarch of one of two main branches of the  "North Arabian" (Adnanite) tribes, the other branch being founded by Mudhar.

Branches
According to the classical Arab genealogists, the following are the important branches of Rabīʿa:
 Abd al-Qays
 Anazzah
 Anz ibn Wa'il
 Bakr ibn Wa'il, which also included the following sub-tribes
 Banu Hanifa
 Banu Shayban
 Banu Qays ibn Tha'laba
 Taym Allah (or Taym Allat)
 Banu Yashkur
 Taghlib ibn Wa'il
 al-Nammir ibn Qasit

Location
Like the rest of the Adnanite Arabs, legend has it that Rabīʿa's original homelands were in the Tihamah region of western Arabia, from which Rabīʿa migrated northwards and eastwards. Abd al-Qays were one of the inhabitants of the region of Eastern Arabia, including the modern-day islands of Bahrain, and were mostly sedentary.

Bakr's lands stretched from al-Yamama (the region around modern-day Riyadh) to northwestern Mesopotamia.  The main body of the tribe was bedouin, but a powerful and autonomous sedentary sub-tribe of Bakr also resided in al-Yamama, the Bani Hanifa.

Taghlib resided on the eastern banks of the Euphrates, and al-Nammir are said to have been their clients.  Anz inhabited southern Arabia, and are said to have been decimated by the plague in the 13th century, though a tribe named "Rabīʿa" in modern-day 'Asir is said to be its descendant.

Anazzah was divided into a sedentary section in southern Yamama and a bedouin section further north.

Abd al-Qays, Taghlib, al-Nammir, and some sections of Bakr were mostly Christian before Islam, with Taghlib remaining a Christian tribe for some time afterwards as well. Anazzah and Bakr are said to have worshiped an idol by the name of al-Sa'eer.

Rabīʿa in Egypt and Sudan
During the Abbasid era, many members of Bani Hanifa and related tribesmen from Bakr ibn Wa'il migrated from al-Yamama to southern Egypt, where they dominated the gold-mines of Wadi Allaqi near Aswan.  While in Egypt, the tribesmen went by the collective name of "Rabi'a" and inter-married with indigenous tribes in the area such as the Beja peoples.  Among their descendants are the tribe of Banu Kanz (also known as the Kunooz), who take their name from Kanz al-Dawlah of Bani Hanifa, the leader of Rabi'a in Egypt during the Fatimid era.

Some Notable people
 Amr ibn Kulthum
 Suhayb al-Rumi 
 Al-Muthanna ibn Haritha
 Abu Layla al-Muhalhel
 Tarafa
 Bahira
 Al-A'sha
 Al-Harith ibn Hilliza al-Yashkuri
 Musaylimah
 Qatada ibn Di'ama
 Malik ibn Tawk
 Khalid ibn Yazid al-Shaybani
 Yazid ibn Mazyad al-Shaybani
 Ma'n ibn Za'ida al-Shaybani
 Abu Dulaf al-Ijli
 Ahmad ibn Hanbal
 Al-Akhtal
 Abu al-Atahiya
 Harith al-Muhasibi
 Haly Abenragel
 Badi' al-Zaman al-Hamadani
 Abu Firas al-Hamdani
 Awn al-Din ibn Hubayra
 Al-Bakri
 Ibn 'Abd al-Barr
 Said al-Andalusi
 Abdullah bin Ali Al Uyuni
 Ibn Saud
 Abdul-Rahman Al-Sudais
 Mohammed bin Ali Aba Al Khail

Royal families which stem from the Rabi'a tribe
 Dulafid dynasty
 Uyunid dynasty
 Hamdanid dynasty.
 Al Saud, rulers of Saudi Arabia.
  Al Khalifa, rulers of Bahrain
  Al Sabah, rulers of Kuwait.
  El Assaad Family
 Banu Kanz
 Mazyadid dynasty
 Shirvanshah
 Taifa of Saltés and Huelva.

References 

Tribes of Arabia
Rabi`ah